The Best American Short Stories 2013, a volume in the Best American Short Stories series, was edited by Heidi Pitlor and by guest editor Elizabeth Strout.

Short Stories included

References

Fiction anthologies
Short Stories 2013
2013 anthologies
Houghton Mifflin books